Jaribu Abdurahman Shahid (born Glenn Henderson, September 11, 1955, Detroit) is an American jazz bassist. He plays both double-bass and electric bass.

Shahid played in the band Griot Galaxy with Faruq Z. Bey in the 1970s, and became the ensemble's leader when Bey fell into a coma in 1984 after a motorcycle crash. Shahid continued leading the group in the 1990s. He was associated with the Creative Arts Collective and played in this capacity with Muhal Richard Abrams, Anthony Braxton, and Roscoe Mitchell. He played with Sun Ra in 1978 and worked extensively with Mitchell in the 1980s and 1990s, as well as with Geri Allen and James Carter. He joined the Art Ensemble of Chicago in 2004.

Discography

With Geri Allen
Open on All Sides in the Middle (Minor Music, 1987)
Twylight (Minor Music, 1989)
With the Art Ensemble of Chicago 
Non-Cognitive Aspects of the City (Pi, 2006)
We Are On the Edge (Pi, 2019)
The Sixth Decade: From Paris to Paris (RogueArt, 2023)
With James Carter
JC on the Set (DIW/Columbia, 1994)
Jurassic Classics (DIW/Columbia, 1995)
The Real Quiet Storm (Atlantic, 1995)
Conversin' with the Elders (Atlantic, 1996)
In Carterian Fashion (Atlantic, 1998)
With Roscoe Mitchell
Snurdy McGurdy and Her Dancin' Shoes (Nessa, 1981)
Roscoe Mitchell and the Sound and Space Ensembles (Black Saint, 1983)
Live at the Knitting Factory (Black Saint, 1987)
3 x 4 Eye (Black Saint, 1991)
This Dance Is for Steve McCall (Black Saint, 1993)
The Bad Guys (Around Jazz, 2000 [2003])
Composition/Improvisation Nos. 1, 2 & 3 (ECM, 2004 [2007])
Turn (RogueArt, 2005)
Far Side (ECM, 2007 [2010])
Bells for the South Side (ECM, 2017)
With David Murray
Octet Plays Trane (Justin Time, 2000)
Gwotet (Justin Time, 2004)
Waltz Again (Justin Time, 2002 [2005])
With Evan Parker
Boustrophedon (ECM, 2004 [2007])
With Strata Institute
Cipher Syntax (JMT, 1989)
With the World Saxophone Quartet
M'Bizo (Justin Time, 1999)
Witn Hugh Ragin
An Afternoon in Harlem (Justin Time, 1999)
Fanfare & Fiesta (Justin Time, 2001)
Feel the Sunshine (Justin Time, 2002)

References

 

American jazz double-bassists
Male double-bassists
American jazz bass guitarists
American male bass guitarists
Musicians from Detroit
1955 births
Living people
20th-century American bass guitarists
Jazz musicians from Michigan
21st-century double-bassists
20th-century American male musicians
21st-century American male musicians
American male jazz musicians
RogueArt artists